The Toyota TZ engine is a series of water-cooled inline four-cylinder gasoline engines from Toyota Motor Corporation. The engines feature dual overhead camshafts (DOHC) and 4 valves per cylinder. The supercharged 2TZ-FZE features an intercooler.

The TZ supplanted the Toyota Y engine in the Toyota Estima/Previa when it replaced the Toyota Van.

Production
Production leadtime 
1990 May – 2000 January (for country)

2TZ-FE
Naturally aspirated
Compression ratio: 9.3:1 
Reference output:  @ 5,000 rpm 
Reference torque:  @ 4,000 rpm 
Applications: 
Estima (TCR10W/11W/20W/21W) 
Estima Emina/Lucida (TCR10G/11G/20G/21G)
2015–2016 GAC Changfeng Liebao Q6 (Four wheel drive based on the Mitsubishi Pajero V20 for the Chinese market under GAC Changfeng since 1995; aka Liebao Heijingang/Qibing (2002/2009 until 2014)

2TZ-FZE
Supercharged (Roots type)
Compression ratio: 8.9:1 
Reference output:  @ 5,000 rpm 
Reference torque:  @ 3,600 rpm 
Applications: 
Estima (TCR10W/11W/20W/21W)

References
 Translated from Japanese Wiki :ja:トヨタ・TZエンジン

TZ engine
Straight-four engines
Gasoline engines by model

ja:トヨタ・TZエンジン